Cashel (an Anglicised form of the Irish language word Caiseal, meaning "stone fort") may refer to:

Places in Ireland
Cashel, County Tipperary 
The Rock of Cashel, an ancient, hilltop fortress complex for which Cashel is named
Archbishop of Cashel
Cashel (Parliament of Ireland constituency), before 1800
Cashel (UK Parliament constituency) (1801–70)
Dean of Cashel
Cashel, County Galway
An Caiseal (or Cashel), a village on Achill island, Co. Mayo

Places in Canada
Cashel, Ontario: neighbourhood in Markham
Tudor and Cashel: township in Hastings County, Ontario

Places elsewhere
Cashel Township, Swift County, Minnesota, United States
Cashel, Zimbabwe

People
Ernest Cashel (1882–1904), American-born outlaw who became famous in Canada for his repeated escapes from custody
Cashel Man, a bog body from the Cúl na Móna bog near Cashel in County Laois, Ireland

See also
Caiseal (disambiguation)